Della Valle may refer to:

People
Alessandro Della Valle, San Marinese footballer
Andrea della Valle, 16th-century Italian cardinal
Andrea Della Valle, Italian entrepreneur
Antonio della Valle, zoologist
Dario Della Valle, Italian Olympic boxer;
Diego Della Valle, Italian entrepreneur – brother of Andrea
Edmondo Della Valle, Italian football player
Filippo della Valle, 18th-century Italian sculptor
Jay Della Valle, American film maker
Nicola Della Valle, Italian singer
Pietro Della Valle, Italian traveller of the 17th century in Asia

Other
Crosio della Valle, comune in Varese
Prato della Valle, square in Padova
San Dorligo della Valle, Italian comune in Trieste
Sant'Andrea della Valle, church (basilica) in Rome

See also
 Del Valle (disambiguation)
 Valle  (disambiguation)

Italian toponymic surnames